Uthoff is a surname. Notable people with the surname include:

Ernst Uthoff Biefang (1904–1993), German-born Chilean ballet dancer, choreographer, and director
Jarrod Uthoff (born 1993), American basketball player

See also
Uhthoff